William Shepherd Morrison, 1st Viscount Dunrossil,  (10 August 1893 – 3 February 1961), was a British politician.  He was a long-serving cabinet minister before serving as Speaker of the House of Commons from 1951 to 1959. He was then appointed as the 14th Governor-General of Australia, in office from 1960 until his death in 1961.

Morrison was the son of a Scottish farmer, born in the small village of Torinturk, Argyll. He attended George Watson's College and then went on to the University of Edinburgh; his studies were interrupted by World War I, where he served with the Royal Field Artillery and won the Military Cross. Training as a lawyer, Morrison was called to the bar in 1923 and began working as a private secretary to Thomas Inskip, the Solicitor General. After several previous attempts, he was elected to the House of Commons in 1929, representing a constituency in Gloucestershire for the Conservative Party.

In 1936, after several years as a junior minister, Morrison was made Minister of Agriculture and Fisheries by Stanley Baldwin. He also served as a minister under Neville Chamberlain and Winston Churchill, including as Minister of Food (1939–1940), Postmaster General (1940–1943), and Minister of Town and Country Planning (1943–1945). Morrison was elevated to the speakership following the 1951 general election. He was praised for his impartiality, especially during the heated debate on the Suez Crisis, and was raised to the viscountcy when his term ended. Lord Dunrossil became governor-general in 1960, on the nomination of Robert Menzies, but served only a year before dying in office.

Early life
Morrison was born in Torinturk, Argyll, Scotland, the son of Marion (née McVicar) and John Morrison. His father was a farmer who had previously spent time working in South Africa's diamond industry. Morrison was educated at George Watson's College and the University of Edinburgh. He joined the British Army as an officer in the First World War and served with an artillery regiment in France, where he won the Military Cross. In 1919 he left the Army with the rank of captain. He married Katharine Swan in 1924, with whom he had four sons.

Political career
Morrison was elected to the House of Commons as Conservative Member of Parliament (MP) for Cirencester and Tewkesbury in 1929. In Parliament he acquired the nickname "Shakes", from his habit of quoting from the works of William Shakespeare.

Government minister
Morrison had a long ministerial career under four Prime Ministers (Ramsay MacDonald, Stanley Baldwin, Neville Chamberlain and Winston Churchill). 
He was:
 Parliamentary Secretary to the Attorney-General 1931–35,
 Financial Secretary to the Treasury 1935–36,
 Minister of Agriculture and Fisheries 1936–39,
 Minister of Food 1939–40,
 Postmaster-General 1940–43
 Minister for Town and Country Planning 1943–45.

Morrison was referred to in the book "Guilty Men" by Michael Foot, Frank Owen and Peter Howard (writing under the pseudonym 'Cato'), published in 1940 as an attack on public figures for their failure to re-arm and their appeasement of Nazi Germany. However, as noted in the diaries of Chips Channon, he was part of the Insurgents, the faction of the Conservative party that worked in secret against appeasement, to oust Chamberlain and replace him with Churchill ahead of the war.

Campaigning during the general election of 1945, Morrison attacked Socialism and claimed that Hitler and Mussolini began as Socialists. He further claimed that although Labour objected to the Conservatives calling themselves 'National', the Conservatives had no objection in their opponents labelling themselves National-Socialists. In 1947 he attacked identity cards which had been introduced during the war because he believed they were a nuisance to law-abiding people and also because the cards were ineffective.

Speaker of the House of Commons
In 1951, when the Conservatives returned to power, Morrison was elected Speaker of the House of Commons. He was opposed by Labour MP Major James Milner, who said it was his party's turn to have a Speaker of the House. It was the first contested election for the post in the twentieth century. Morrison was elected in a vote on party lines.

Governor-General of Australia

Morrison held the post of Speaker until 1959, when he announced that he would not be contesting the forthcoming general election but retiring for reasons of health. As was customary for former Speakers, he was made a Viscount, taking the title Viscount Dunrossil, of Vallaquie in the Isle of North Uist and County of Inverness. Given his health, it surprised many when it was announced shortly thereafter that he had been chosen to succeed Sir William Slim as Governor-General of Australia. He was also appointed a Knight Grand Cross of the Order of St Michael and St George (GCMG) that year. By this time support for the idea of British governors-general was declining in Australia, but the Liberal Prime Minister, Robert Menzies, was determined to maintain the British link (and, in particular, the Scottish link).

Dunrossil took office on 2 February 1960. He was the first governor-general since Isaac Isaacs (1931–1936) to wear the full ceremonial vice-regal uniform, but despite this was known for having a more relaxed approach than his predecessor. Dunrossil suffered from ill health while in office, and his wife frequently deputised for him at ceremonial events. He suffered a pulmonary embolism on the morning of 3 February 1961, becoming the first and only governor-general to die in office. He was granted a state funeral, and buried at St John the Baptist Church, Reid. His Official Secretary throughout his term was Murray Tyrrell.

Dunrossil was succeeded in the viscountcy by his son, John Morrison, 2nd Viscount Dunrossil, who was a career officer in the Foreign & Commonwealth Office, holding several senior diplomatic appointments, including serving as Governor of Bermuda. He was proud to wear his father's vice-regal hat on formal occasions on the island colony.

Honours, decorations and arms

Morrison was unusual in having separate, and entirely different, grants of arms from both the College of Arms in England and the Lyon Court in Scotland.

Notes

External links
 
 ADB Entry

1893 births
1961 deaths
Morrison, William
Alumni of the University of Edinburgh
British Army personnel of World War I
English King's Counsel
Chairmen of the 1922 Committee
Morrison, William
Morrison, William
Conservative Party (UK) hereditary peers
Governors-General of Australia
Knights Grand Cross of the Order of St Michael and St George
Members of the Privy Council of the United Kingdom
Ministers in the Chamberlain peacetime government, 1937–1939
Ministers in the Chamberlain wartime government, 1939–1940
Ministers in the Churchill caretaker government, 1945
Ministers in the Churchill wartime government, 1940–1945
Viscounts created by Elizabeth II
People educated at George Watson's College
Politicians awarded knighthoods
Recipients of the Military Cross
Royal Artillery officers
Morrison, William
Morrison, William
Morrison, William
Morrison, William
Morrison, William
Morrison, William
Morrison, William
Morrison, William
UK MPs who were granted peerages
Morrison, William
Viscounts in the Peerage of the United Kingdom
British King's Counsel